Taviodes is a genus of moths of the family Erebidae. The genus was erected by George Hampson in 1926.

Species
Taviodes congenita Hampson, 1926 southern Nigeria
Taviodes discomma Hampson, 1926 Ghana, Nigeria
Taviodes excisa Hampson, 1926 southern Nigeria
Taviodes fulvescens Hampson, 1926 north-eastern Himalayas, Thailand, Peninsular Malaysia, Sumatra, Borneo
Taviodes hollowayi Kobes, 2005 Sumatra
Taviodes javanica Roepke, 1954 western Java
Taviodes subjecta (Walker, 1865) Zaire, Kenya, Mozambique, Zambia, Swaziland, Zimbabwe, South Africa
Taviodes tamsi Gaede, 1939 Ghana
Taviodes virgata Griveaud & Viette, 1962 Madagascar

References

Calpinae